The 1920 Wyoming Cowboys football team was an American football team that represented the University of Wyoming as a member of the Rocky Mountain Conference (RMC) during the 1920 college football season. In their fifth season under head coach John Corbett, the Cowboys compiled a 4–5–1 record (2–5–1 against conference opponents), finished seventh in the RMC, and were outscored by a total of 106 to 58. Milward Simpson was the team captain.

Schedule

References

Wyoming
Wyoming Cowboys football seasons
Wyoming Cowboys football